Qiu Zhonghui also known as Chiu Chung-Hui is a former international table-tennis player from China and won China's first women's world title in the World Table Tennis Championships of 1961.

Table tennis career
From 1956 to 1963 she won ten medals in singles, doubles, and team events in the World Table Tennis Championships.

The ten World Championship medals  included a gold medal in the singles at the 1961 World Table Tennis Championships.

See also
 List of table tennis players
 List of World Table Tennis Championships medalists

References

Chinese female table tennis players
1935 births
Living people
People from Tengchong
Table tennis players from Yunnan